Dona Lluna: A Tribute to Womankind is a sculpture by Saülo Mercader, standing in the middle of a rotunda, in the heart of the City of Sant Vicent del Raspeig, the home of Alicante University, in Southeastern Spain. It was unveiled on March 11, 2007 by local dignitaries and a symphony orchestra from Madrid. 

The sculpture, representing the shape of a powerful and massive female body, weighs 2 tons and is 4 metres high. The sculpture  is surrounded by twelve painted stones ( 2 metres high) forming a lunar calendar.

It is inspired by Saülo Mercader's birth in 1944, in a mansion called Los Molinos in the city of San Vicente del  Raspeig  where he lived for the first five years of his childhood. Dona Lluna is a Valencian name which means Moon Lady. It is engraved with the statement, "Aquí nací, aquí doy" ("I was born here, I give–her this work of art–here").

External links
 website on Saülo Mercader's artwork.
https://web.archive.org/web/20070929085545/http://www.saulomercader.net/
http://loeildegaia.free.fr/dona-lluna.html

Bronze sculptures in Spain
Outdoor sculptures in Spain
Buildings and structures in the Province of Alicante